Milano miliardaria is a 1951 Italian comedy film directed by Marino Girolami, Marcello Marchesi and Vittorio Metz.

Cast
 Tino Scotti: Cavalier Luigi Pizzigoni 
 Isa Barzizza: Vittoria Pizzigoni 
 Franca Marzi: Italia Furioni 
 Dante Maggio: Peppino Avallone 
 Mario Carotenuto: Avvocato Amleto Furioni 
 Aroldo Tieri: Marito geloso 
 Giovanni Barrella: Comm. Fantini 
 Alberto Sorrentino: Oscar, il fotografo 
 Galeazzo Benti: Walter 
 Marsha Gayle: Corinna  
 Gipsy Kiss: Giovannina 
 Vera Carmi: Paola 
 Giovanni D'Anzi: Se stesso 
 Sofia Loren: Commessa del bar 
 Carlo Giuffré: Tifoso coi pomodori 
 Roberto Murolo: Himself
 Giuseppe Meazza: Himself

External links
 

1951 films
1950s Italian-language films
Films set in Milan
Films directed by Marino Girolami
Italian comedy films
1951 comedy films
Italian black-and-white films
1950s Italian films